Blackcomb Glacier Provincial Park is a provincial park in British Columbia, Canada, located just east of and above the resort town of Whistler and adjacent to Garibaldi Provincial Park. The park was established in 1990 on land formerly protected by Garibaldi Park.

External links

”Blackcomb Glacier Provincial Park”. BC Parks.

Provincial parks of British Columbia
Whistler, British Columbia
Garibaldi Ranges
1990 establishments in British Columbia
New Westminster Land District